Windsor Park Mall was a shopping mall located on the northeast side of San Antonio, Texas, off Interstate 35 and Walzem Road. It opened in 1976 and closed in 2005.

In 2007, the building, of which ownership was transferred to the suburb of Windcrest, Texas, became the new corporate headquarters of Rackspace, a Web hosting company. Their redevelopment of the mall structure, now known as "The Castle", has sparked a redevelopment of the surrounding area.

History

1976-2007: Windsor Park Mall
Melvin Simon and Associates announced their development plans for the mall in 1974, and the center opened on July 29, 1976. The original anchors were Montgomery Ward, JCPenney, Joske's and Dillard's. A 1985 expansion added Mervyns to the mall. In 1987, Joske's merged with Dillard's, and the former Joske's was converted into a Dillard's home store on the lower level, while the upper level was transformed into a food court, which cost $8 million ($ in  dollars). Simon opened Rolling Oaks Mall (also in northeast San Antonio) in 1988, and in conjunction with the new mall, Simon renovated Windsor Park between 1987 and November 1990. The second phase of renovations gave the mall a Southwestern theme, adding skylights and an octagon-shaped stage, as well as marble floors and new fountains. At this time, Windsor Park had 135 tenants and an occupancy rate of 97%.

In the 1990s, demographic changes in the surrounding neighborhood led to a rise in crime at Windsor Park Mall. In one of the first incidents, in February 1991, a 20-year-old man was stabbed with a knife and killed at the mall's VIA Metropolitan Transit park and ride. In another, a teenager trying to shoot a rival gang member killed a 64-year-old woman when she came between the two at the mall's bus stop. The incidents eventually resulted in Simon terminating the leases of the VIA transit facilities at Windsor Park and its other San Antonio malls. In 1994, an altercation inside the mall disrupted holiday shoppers when two teenagers got into an argument that escalated into gunshots; the victim died of his injuries. In 1995, the Bexar County Sheriff's Department announced it was opening an annex at the mall. The crime and resulting safety concerns began to take their toll on the success of Windsor Park, and by 2001, Simon considered using the mall as a small business incubator.

The national closure in 2001 of one of the more successful anchors of the mall, Wards, marked the beginning of the end of Windsor Park's life as a shopping mall. Dillard's closed in January 2002, a year in which mall occupancy dipped to 45% and the mall was sold by Simon to Whichard Real Estate of North Carolina. The mix of occupants had become nontraditional: government agencies, social organizations, churches, a nightclub and even a "bazaar" flea market were tenants in the mall's dying days; meanwhile, Whichard entertained the idea of converting Windsor Park to an outlet mall, commissioning Bruce Targoff, formerly of the Mills Corporation, to present a redevelopment plan. JCPenney closed in 2004 (as they opened a store at Rolling Oaks), and Mervyn's, the last anchor, shut its doors on August 31, 2005, as part of that chain's closure of 62 stores, heralding the mall's closure.

The vacant Montgomery Ward, then owned by Graham Weston, the chairman and co-founder of Rackspace, was used in 2005 to shelter 3,300 victims of Hurricane Katrina and some 3,000 refugees of Hurricane Rita.

2007-present: The Castle
Rackspace entered the picture again in 2007. The company was rapidly outgrowing its newly leased corporate headquarters, which were in a building formerly used by Datapoint on the northwest side of San Antonio; seeking even more space, Rackspace bought the mall for $27 million. As part of its acquisition of Windsor Park, the city boundaries of San Antonio were modified to place  of land, including the former mall, into the suburb of Windcrest; that city had lost $100,000 in taxes each year since the mall's closure in 2005. Rackspace hired architect and urban planner Andrés Duany and renovated the former mall (now known as "The Castle") for more than $100 million, having received a $22 million grant from the state of Texas. Renovations also added environmentally friendly features such as a rainwater cistern and dual flush toilets; in 2009, The Castle received LEED Gold certification. By 2012, 3,200 employees worked at the former mall site. The redevelopment of Windsor Park has attracted retail and multi-family residential development geared to the higher incomes of Rackspace employees (on average $69,000 a year, compared to $37,000 a year, the local average), and Rackspace is developing a neighborhood park around the site.

Among the features of The Castle are a two-story slide, 80 conference rooms, cable car-type gondolas repurposed from the closed Sky Ride at Brackenridge Park, a coffee shop and fitness center and art installations. The Castle also integrates the neon Food Court sign from the mall that was added in the 1987 renovations. ,  of the  former mall has been renovated. In addition, in one of the escalator wells, there is a word search that held the Guinness World Record for world's largest word search at the time of its creation.

The perimeter road around the center, which was added by Rackspace on a new route, is known as Fanatical Place (in reference to the company's value of "Fanatical Support"); another access road is named Racker Road, after the nickname for Rackspace employees.

Former anchors
Dillard's, 
Joske's (upper level became a food court in 1987)
Dillard's Home Store, lower level of former Joske's, 1987
JCPenney, 
Montgomery Ward, 
Mervyns,

Notes

References

External links
Rackspace Blog post containing a Google Street View of the inside of The Castle

Shopping malls in San Antonio
Defunct shopping malls in the United States
Shopping malls established in 1976
Shopping malls disestablished in 2005
2005 disestablishments in Texas